The Convento de San Pascual is a royal monastery in Aranjuez, in the Community of Madrid, Spain, founded by King Charles III of Spain as a Franciscan monastery and built from 1765 to 1770. Under the reign of Isabel II of Spain, it was assigned to the Conceptionist  nuns, and now is under the administration of the Patrimonio Nacional.

The architect was the Italian Francesco Sabatini. The main altar has a painting by Anton Raphael Mengs.

It was declared Bien de Interés Cultural in 1999.

References

External links 

 Convent of San Pascual

Roman Catholic churches completed in 1770
Roman Catholic churches in the Community of Madrid
Buildings and structures in Aranjuez
San Pascual
Bien de Interés Cultural landmarks in the Community of Madrid
Convents in Spain
1770 establishments in Spain
18th-century Roman Catholic church buildings in Spain